Matthew O'Connor (born April 29, 1984) is a Canadian former soccer player who played in the Canadian Professional Soccer League, USL A-League, Dhivehi League, Nemzeti Bajnokság II, and the USL Premier Development League.

Career
O'Connor began his college career with the Ottawa Gee-Gees, before joining Erin Mills SC. He began his professional career in 2001 with Glen Shields Sun Devils in the Canadian Professional Soccer League. In 2002, he signed a contract with Hamilton Thunder. On June 29, 2002 he was loaned to the Calgary Storm of the USL A-League. In 2003, he helped Hamilton clinch their first Western Conference title, and secured a postseason berth. On July 30, 2004, marked his return to the USL being loaned out to the Toronto Lynx where he appeared in six matches.  

In 2005, he went abroad to Maldives to sign with Club Valencia of the Dhivehi League. The following season he returned to the CSL to sign with the Oakville Blue Devils. During his tenure with Oakville he secured the National Division title. In 2007, he was transferred to the Italia Shooters, and played briefly with Brampton Lions in 2008.  In July 2008, he joined Royal Racing FC Montegnee, playing his first match on 24 August, 2008. On 24 July 2009, he signed a contract with Integrál-DAC. In 2010, he returned to North America to play with Palm Beach SC, and the York Region Shooters. 

His brother Miles O'Connor also plays football.

References

External links 
 

1989 births
Living people
Association football defenders
Brampton United players
Calgary Storm players
Canada men's youth international soccer players
Canadian expatriate soccer players
Canadian expatriate sportspeople in Hungary
Canadian Soccer League (1998–present) players
Canadian soccer players
Club Valencia players
Expatriate footballers in Hungary
Expatriate footballers in the Maldives
Hamilton Thunder players
Integrál-DAC footballers
Nemzeti Bajnokság II players
Soccer players from Mississauga
Toronto Lynx players
York Region Shooters players